Exodus is a customized 1959 Chevrolet Impala built by Bill Cushenbery in 1961.

Built for Tony Cardoza, Exodus debuted at the 1961 Monterey Kar Kapades. It had twin vertical headlights. It also had chromed Dagmar bumpers.

Every body panel was altered in some way, setting a new trend in customizing.

Exodus and El Matador, which appeared the same year, drew a lot of attention to Cushenbery and a lot of custom work for his shop.

Notes

Sources 
Mauldin, Calvin. "Bill Cushenbery:  Custom Creations for the Future", in Rod & [sic] Custom, December 1998, p. 83-5.

Further reading 
Dregni, Michael. The All-American Hot Rod. Motorbooks, 2009.

External links 
 Fotki
 Jalopyjournal
 Imgrumweb

Modified vehicles
Automotive styling features
One-off cars
Chevrolet vehicles
1950s cars
1960s cars
Kustom Kulture
Individual cars
Rear-wheel-drive vehicles
History of California